Salvage Hunters is a British television programme in which decorative salvage dealer Drew Pritchard travels throughout the country in search of antiques from shops, fairs and old mansions to re-sell online or in his shop.

The programme has aired on Quest since 2011, for 15 series.

Format overview
Each episode features Drew Pritchard visiting a number of locations to find collectable stock to resell. Usually, he travels with his long-time friend "Tee" (John Tee), who acts as van driver and loader when moving the purchased items.

The format includes travelling to the locations, the purchase of various items, after some haggling on prices, and a product style explanation, then the drive back to his base in Conwy, showing the purchases to his team, the restoration process, and items being photographed for sale. There is a final summary of the deal, and often of the price achieved after an item has been sold.

The sellers include private estates, antiques shops, trade markets and private individuals.

Buying trips abroad included Belgium,  France,  Germany,  Hungary,  Italy, Netherlands, Norway, Republic of Ireland and Spain.

Pritchard's team is composed of a number of restorers, such as an electrician, a French polisher, a photographer, and several shop and office staff, including his now ex-wife Rebecca. The series is narrated by Ralph Ineson.

Spin off programmes
 Salvage Hunters: Best Buys
 Salvage Hunters: Bitesize
 Salvage Hunters: The Restorers
 Salvage Hunters: Classic Cars
 Salvage Hunters: Design Classics
 Salvage Hunters: Best Restorations

Transmissions

See also
American Pickers
Salvage Dawgs

References

External links
Salvage Hunters on Discovery+/Quest

2011 British television series debuts
2020s British television series
Antiques television series
English-language television shows
Quest (British TV channel) original programming